The following are the winners of the 8th annual (1981) Origins Award, presented at Origins 1982:

Charles Roberts Awards

The H.G. Wells Awards

External links
 1981 Origins Awards Winners

1981 awards
1981 awards in the United States
Origins Award winners